The Public Power Corporation S.A. (abbreviated PPC,  or DEI ) is the largest electric power company in Greece.

History
PPC was founded by the Greek government in 1950. Its main purpose was to plan and apply a national energy policy which, through the exploitation of the domestic products and resources, would distribute cheap electric power to all Greek citizens. PPC started the integration of all the small local grids to the national interconnected grid. Furthermore, the corporation resolved the purchase of all the small private and local electric power production units.

Today, PPC Group consists of 3 subsidiary companies PPC S.A., the Hellenic Electricity Distribution Network Operator (HEDNO or DEDDIE) S.A. and PPC RENEWABLES S.A. Even if HEDNO S.A. (the Greek DSO) is owned by PPC, HEDNO S.A. operates independently according to L.4001/2011 and in compliance with 2009/72/EC EU Directive relative to the electricity market organization.

Shareholders

On 16 November 2021, the company completed a share capital increase that the Greek government as a shareholder chose not participate in. As a result, the Greek government's shareholding decreased from 51.12% to 34.12%, which is currently held by the country sovereign wealth fund, the Hellenic Corporation of Assets and Participations (HCAP). This change in shareholding means PPC has been privatised and is no longer controlled by the Greek government.

On 3 March 2022, CVC Capital Partners acquired 10% of the company's shareholding.

The Company’s shares are traded in the «Large Cap» category of the Athens Stock Exchange (ATHEX), while in the London Stock Exchange they are traded in the form of global depository receipts (GDRs).

The Company’s shareholding structure as of 10 March 2023 was as follows:

Privatisation
In 2001, PPC carried out a share flotation on the Athens Stock Exchange and consequently was no longer wholly owned by the government, although it was still controlled by it with a 51.1% stake until 2021.

In June 2011, the Greek government announced it would sell 17% of its share of PPC to meet conditions of EU/ECB/IMF loan package. The workers of PPC responded by limited power cuts to selected towns across Greece. However, the Tsipras Government decided to suspend the privatisation of PPC as one of its first anti-austerity measures.

The company was eventually privatised in November 2021, when the Greek government decreased its shareholding to 34.12% and transferred it to the Greek sovereign wealth fund, the Hellenic Corporation of Assets and Participations (HCAP).

Renewable energy

In 1982, PPC developed the first wind farm in the world, combined with a photo-voltaic station to supply electricity to the isolated power system of the island of Kythnos.

The PPC has committed to buying renewable-source energy from independent producers at five times its selling rate until 2034.

Legislation before Parliament in 2013-14 included making the PPC responsible for collection of the real estate tax, part of the EU/IMF/ECB requirements for the financial support of the economy.

Power plants
The 34 major thermal and hydroelectric power plants and the 3 wind farms of the interconnected power grid of the mainland, as well as the 60 autonomous power plants located on Crete, Rhodes and other Greek islands (33 thermal, 2 hydroelectric, 18 wind energy and 5 photovoltaic parks) form PPC's industrial assets and constitute the energy basis of all financial activities of the country.

The total installed capacity of the 97 PPC's power plants is currently 12,760 MW with a net generation of 53.9 TWh in 2007.

Carbon intensity

Mining areas
PPC has mining areas adjacent to many of its power plants. Some of these power plants produce electricity and power from lignite, while other plants use coal. The largest mining areas are located around Ptolemaida, around Amyntaio in the Florina prefecture and around Megalopolis.

Legal issues
In 2005, PPC was found to have awarded a contract for the construction of a conveyor-belt system for waste produced at its generating plant in Megalopolis without following correct advertising procedures under EU public procurement law. The need for the system had arisen following an environmental impact assessment, after which the Greek Ministry of the Environment, Urban Planning and Public Works had imposed a deadline of December 2000 for the installation of the system. PPC had therefore decided to negotiate a deal for the construction instead of advertising the opportunity; the court held that these circumstances did not quality as "extreme urgency" for the purposes of the procurement regulations.

See also

 Energy in Greece

References

External links

 Financial Data 2014 (PDF; 3,1 mb)

Electric power companies of Greece
Public utilities of Greece
Companies based in Athens
Energy companies established in 1950
Companies listed on the Athens Exchange
Greek companies established in 1950